Emergency Support Services (formerly known as Emergency Social Services) (ESS) is a component of the Provincial Emergency Program of the Province of British Columbia. ESS are those services required to preserve the well-being of people affected by an emergency or disaster. Teams are established in local municipalities and assemble together for meetings and contingency planning.

Provisions

Although ESS is designed to provide services to individuals affected by large complex disasters or emergencies, ESS may also be provided during smaller emergencies; for example a single house fire or emergencies affecting 1 to 2 families in a community.

ESS provides temporary relief to individuals and families so they can begin to plan their next steps to recover after a disaster.

ESS provides primary services such as: food;lodging;clothing; and family reunification. It may also provide specialized services such as: emotional support services; first aid; child minding; pet care; and transportation services

ESS teams assist people affected by disaster, usually at Reception Centres. Reception Centres may be located at the local community centre, recreation centre, church, or school.

ESS teams may also provide services in the following settings: outreach services to those unable to leave their homes; 
mass care (lodging and feeding) to evacuees during a major disaster; on-site services to response workers and others.

Regions

British Columbia is Canada's third largest province, and its most mountainous. PEP divides the province into regions for manageability reasons.
 Vancouver Island Region: covers the Island, and much of the coastal region of the corresponding mainland including the following regions:
 Victoria Capital
 Cowichan Valley
 Nanaimo
 Alberni - Clayoquot
 Powell River
 Comox - Strathcona
 Mount Waddington
 South West region: is the most populated, and includes the Lower Mainland and the Fraser Valley, and it includes
 Sunshine Coast
 Squamish - Lillooet (but not including the communities of: Birken, Bralorne, Gold Bridge, Pavilion, Lillooet, Seton Portage, Shalalth)
 Central Region: takes in the Thompson-Okanagan area and parts of the Columbia-Shuswap
 Thompson - Nicola
 Okanagan - Similkameen
 Central Okanagan
 North Okanagan
 Squamish - Lillooet (only including the communities of: Birken, Bralorne, Gold Bridge, Pavilion, Lillooet, Seton Portage, Shalalth) 
Columbia - Shuswap (only the area including the communities of: Anglemont, Falkland, Salmon Arm, Sicamous, Canoe, Malakwa, Sorrento, Tappen)
 South East Region: includes the Kootenays and most of the Columbia-Shuswap
 Kootenay Boundary
 Central Kootenay
 East Kootenay
 Columbia - Shuswap (not including the communities of: Anglemont, Falkland, Salmon Arm District, Sicamous, Canoe, Malakwa, Sorrento, Tappen) 
 North East Region: the second largest, comprises the North Coast, including Haida Gwaii, Skeena, Bulkley–Nechako, and along the Alaska and Yukon borders.
Northern Rockies
Peace River
Fraser - Fort George
Cariboo
Central Coast 
 North West Region: the largest in the province, takes in the Peace River Country, Cariboo and Central Coast
 Stikine
 Kitimat - Stikine
 Bulkley - Nechako
 Skeena - Queen Charlotte

Volunteers' Powers, Privileges & Recognition

 Volunteers are allowed to use the Disaster Response Route when on duty
 Under Section 27(1b) of the Emergency Program Act, a person commits an offence who interferes with or obstructs any person in the exercise of any power or the performance of any duty conferred or imposed by this Act or the regulations is liable to imprisonment for a term of not more than one year or to a fine of not more than $10 000 or to both imprisonment and fine.
 Civil Liability Exemption under Section 18 of the Emergency Program Act
 WorkSafeBC coverage
 The BC government maintains a comprehensive general liability insurance policy with a limit of $2 million covering all provincial volunteers
 Good Samaritan Act applies to all volunteers (unless grossly negligent)
 Trainings from the Provincial, Regional & Municipal Governments
 Special awards night every year

Note  
Only persons over the age of 16 may sign up to become a volunteer. Persons aged 16–18 must have parental consent. There is no maximum age limit.

See also
E-Comm, 9-1-1 call and dispatch centre for Southwestern BC
HealthLink BC
Emergency Management BC

References

External links
  Emergency Support Services

British Columbia government departments and agencies